James N. Gianopulos is an American businessman. He served as the head of 20th Century Fox and most recently as the chairman and chief executive officer (CEO) of Paramount Pictures until his ouster in September 2021.

Early life
James N. Gianopulos was born in 1952 in Brooklyn, New York City. He is a second-generation Greek American. He graduated from Boston University with a Bachelor of Arts degree in 1973, received a Juris Doctor from the Fordham University School of Law in 1976, and an LL.M. program from the New York University School of Law.

Career
He started his career by working at Paramount and Lorimar. He then worked in the International Distribution department of Fox Filmed Entertainment.

He was co-chair of Fox Filmed Entertainment with Tom Rothman from 2000 to 2012. In 2006, the Gianopulos and Rothman team had greenlit twenty movies that produced over $100 million domestically ($ million in current dollars) and 26 movies that fetched $100 million internationally ($ million in current dollars)..

He took over as the sole chairman of Fox beginning in 2012. In this position, he served as the head of 20th Century Fox, Fox Searchlight, Fox 2000, Fox Animation/Blue Sky Studios, Fox International Productions and Fox Home Entertainment. He has argued for a closer relationship between Hollywood and Silicon Valley, especially with regards to anti-piracy efforts.

He serves on the board of directors of the Motion Picture & Television Fund. He is also on the board of trustees of the X Prize Foundation as well as the board of the University of Southern California Entertainment Technology Committee. Gianopulos is also a member of the board of trustees of the Academy Museum of Motion Pictures.

In 2013, he joined USC's School of Cinematic Arts Board of Councilors.

In March 2017, he was named Chairman and CEO of Paramount Pictures, after the dismissal of the late Brad Grey. Gianopulos began his duties on April 3, 2017.

It was announced that CBS and Viacom (parent company of Paramount Pictures) would recombine as ViacomCBS in December 2019. Jim Gianopulos was confirmed to continue on as chairman and CEO of Paramount Pictures under the merged ViacomCBS. Gianopulos was fired from Paramount in September 2021 and replaced by Nickelodeon president Brian Robbins.

Personal life
He is married to his second wife Ann Gianopulos. They have three daughters named Alexa, Niki, and Mimi.

References

External links
 

Living people
Year of birth missing (living people)
Businesspeople from New York City
Boston University alumni
Fordham University School of Law alumni
New York University School of Law alumni
American chief executives in the media industry
American people of Greek descent
American film studio executives
20th Century Studios people
Paramount Pictures executives